The 2023 IBA Women's World Boxing Championships are the 13th edition of the championships and held in New Delhi, India from 15 to 26 March 2023.

Medal winners are awarded prize money; gold medallists earn $100,000, silver medallists $50,000, and bronze medallists $25,000. The overall prize fund is $2.4 million.

In June 2022, the International Olympic Committee (IOC) barred the International Boxing Association's (IBA) rights to run and organize the tournament due to "continuing irregularity issues in the areas of finance, governance, ethics, refereeing, and judging". Hence, the IOC executive board established and ratified a new qualification system for Paris 2024 that would witness the boxers obtain the quota spots through the continental multisport events, reducing the complexity of the process. The qualification period commences at five regional multisport events in the middle of the 2023 season (African Games in Accra, Ghana; Asian Games in Hangzhou, China; European Games in Kraków, Poland; Pacific Games in Honiara, Solomon Islands; and the Pan American Games in Santiago, Chile), set to be served as continental qualifying meets, where a total of 139 spots will be assigned to a specific number of highest-ranked boxers in each weight category. For these reasons, this tournament does not give a quota for the Olympic Games.

Schedule
All times are local (UTC+5:30).

Medal summary

Participating nations
The following nations participate with total participation entries of 324:

 (1)
 (6)
 (6)
 (9)
 (6)
 (6)
 (3)
 (7)
 (6)
 (1)
 (1)
 (12)
 (9)
 (9)
 (1)
 (3)
 (1)
 (1)
 (9)
 (1)
 (2)
 (3)
 (2)
 (1)
 (8)
 (12) Host
 (8)
 (8)
 (1)
 (12)
 (11)
 (1)
 (1)
 (8)
 (2)
 (8)
 (4)
 (4)
 (7)
 Netherlands (1)
 (6)
 (1)
 (3)
 (4)
 (4)
 (12)
 (1)
 (7)
 (1)
 (5)
 (3)
 (3)
 (8)
 (5)
 (2)
 (4)
 (2)
 (9)
 (3)
 (3)
 (12)
 (1)
 (10)
 (4)
 (9)

Controversies

Participation of athletes from Russia and Belarus
As a result of the 2022 Russian invasion of Ukraine, 11 countries decided to boycot the championship over the participation of athletes from Russia and Belarus. The decision to allow athletes form Russia and Belarus to compete under their national flags and for the anthems to be played was against the recommendations of the International Olympic Committee.

The nations that boycotted the competition are:

 
 
 
 
 
 
 
 
 
 
 
 
 
 

Megan de Cler is the lone boxer from Netherlands in WWCH 2023 under IBA flag. While interacting with media on March 17 after her bout, she told ,"I am not playing for Netherlands, I am here on my own. I don't do politics, I do boxing that's why I'm here".

Kosovo boxer withdrawal 
Kosovo withdrew its competitors from the championship as a result of alleged discrimination by the Indian authorities. Despite the Kosovo Boxing Federation being a full member of the IBA, local organisers decided to ban the use of the flag and national anthem of Kosovo at the championship, including in medal ceremonies and on team uniforms for political reasons. Kosovo's sole entrant, 2022 bronze medalist Donjeta Sadiku, also encountered problems in obtaining a visa to enter India for the competition. Sadiku was previously denied entry to India in 2017 for the Youth Women's World Championships and 2018 for the Women’s World Championships. Kosovo's president Vjosa Osmani described the treatment of athletes from her country as a "blatant violation of int'l sporting standards" and urged the organisers to reconsider their decision. The IBA's media communications team termed the incident as "unfortunate and the Indian government was also very cooperative, and the team was granted visas for the competitions. It was unfortunate to learn that the athletes of Kosovo declined the opportunity to come to New Delhi."

Nepali Boxer Anjani Teli
Question has been raised over Indian born Nepali Boxer Anjani Teli. IBA had investigation into allegations made her. However she was given clean chit as she had acquired never acquired Indian passport. She was born in Delhi by migrated Nepali parents. And she received Nepali password 8 year as her parents being from Nepal. IBA has allowed her to continue participating in the tournament

See also
IBA World Boxing Championships
International Boxing Association

References

External links
IBA website

 
2023
IBA
IBA Women's World Boxing Championships
International boxing competitions hosted by India
Sport in New Delhi
IBA Women's World Boxing Championships
IBA